Robert Hoyt may refer to:

 Robert Hoyt (journalist) (1922–2003), American journalist
 Robert P. Hoyt, physicist and engineer
 Robert Hoyt (sound engineer), American sound engineer

See also
 Hoyt (disambiguation)